{{Infobox international football competition
| tourney_name = 19th Arabian Gulf Cup
| year = 
| other_titles = الخلیج العربي''  Kass Al-Khaleej Al-Arabi, or Khaleeji 19| image = 2009 Gulf Cup of Nations logo.svg
| size = 250px
| caption = 19th Arabian Gulf Cup official logo
| country = Oman
| country2 =
| dates = 4–17 January 2009
| num_teams = 8
| venues = 2
| cities = 1
| champion = Oman
| count = 1
| second = Saudi Arabia
| third_other =
| matches = 15
| goals = 31
| attendance =
| top_scorer =  Hassan Rabia (4 goals)
| player =  Majed Al-Marshedi
| goalkeeper =  Ali Al-Habsi
| prevseason = 2007
| nextseason = 2010
| updated = 17 January
}}

The 19th Arabian Gulf Cup was the nineteenth edition of the biannual Gulf Cup competition, and took place in Muscat, Oman, from 4 to 17 January 2009 and was won by Oman for the first time in its history, in a penalty shootout against regional rivals, Saudi Arabia.

The 19th Arabian Gulf Cup marked as a milestone in the competition when it was broadcast for the first time in HD, and featured virtual graphics, such as distance between free kick barrier and the goal, 9.15 m circle for free-kicks, and off-side line detection with help from Al-Jazeera Sports. Many praised Al-Jazeera for their excellent coverage of the competition, noting that the camerawork was very similar to UEFA Euro 2008.

 The postponing of the competition 
The 19th Arabian Gulf Cup was originally planned out to be held in 2008, but due to Cyclone Gonu damaging Muscat six months before the planned time of the event, it was then postponed to early 2009.

 Teams 
8 teams participated in the tournament.

  (Host)
  (Holder)
 
 
 
 
 
 

 The Draw 
 The draw was held in Oman on 29 October 2008.
 Eight teams were divided into two groups, Oman (The host nation) was in group A, The UAE (The holder) in group B, while the rest of the teams were placed in a pot based in October 2008's FIFA ranking.
 Oman played the opening match at Sultan Qaboos Sports Complex.

 Seedings 

 Venues 

 Squads 

 Matches 

 Group A 

 Group B 

 Semi finals 

 Final 

 Winners 

 Goalscorers 

4 goals
  Hassan Rabia
2 goals
  Malek Mouath
  Yasser Al-Qahtani
  Ahmed Al-Fraidi
  Ali Al Nono
1 goal
  Abdullah Al-Dakheel
  Abdullah Omar
  Sayed Mohamed Adnan
  Alaa Abdul-Zahra
  Younis Mahmoud
  Abdullah Al-Zori

1 goal (cont.)
  Abdullah Shuhail
  Ahmed Al-Mousa
  Ahmed Otaif
  Khaled Khalaf
  Musaed Neda
  Badar Al-Maimani
  Imad Al-Hosni
  Fawzi Bashir
  Majdi Siddiq
  Musa Haroon
  Mohammed Omar
  Ismail Al-Hammadi
  Mohamed Al-Shehhi

 Team statistics 
This table shows all team performance.

 Total goals by team 10 goals  7 goals   3 goals  
  2 goals '''

Trivia 
 FIFA president Sepp Blatter came to Oman for the second time, and attended the Oman/Qatar, and the Saudi Arabia/Kuwait games.
 UEFA president, and French football legend, Michel Platini attended the Oman/Kuwait, and the Bahrain/Iraq games, both in the Sultan Qaboos Sports Complex.
 Singer Mohammed Abdo attended the final match between Oman and his native, Saudi Arabia.
 The Tournament took place during the Israeli bombardment of Gaza, also known as the Gaza War, as a sign of solidarity toward the Palestinians, many fans waved pro-Palestinian banners and chanted pro-Palestinian slogans. Omani footballer Badr Al-Maimani also revealed a pro-Gaza undershirt after his free-kick goal against Bahrain. Also before the opening match played by Yemen, players wore shirts representing solidarity with Palestine. The Kuwaiti team also did the same in their opening match against Oman, but instead wore scarves.

References

External links 
 Official Site
 Gulf Cup website (Arabic)
 Live Matches

 
2009
2009 in Asian football
2008–09 in Omani football
2008–09 in Emirati football
2008–09 in Yemeni football
2008–09 in Bahraini football
2008–09 in Saudi Arabian football
2008–09 in Kuwaiti football
2008–09 in Iraqi football
2008–09 in Qatari football
Arabian Gulf Cup